S3 Graphics' Chrome series of graphics accelerators arrived in 2004 with the DeltaChrome line of chips. They were supplied as discrete, mobile, or integrated graphics.

Overview

In 2004 after the S3 Graphics company spun off their joint-venture with VIA, VIA attempted to re-launch the S3 Graphics brand with a new line of video cards under the name 'Chrome'. The Chrome range featured low power requirements and high-definition output making it attractive for small form factor scenarios and OEM systems. Unfortunately by the time Chrome released, the rapid progression of 3D gaming performance between rivals NVIDIA and ATI Technologies made S3's offerings uncompetitive in the lucrative high end consumer market.

The Chrome series supports Direct3D 9 with full pixel shader 2.0 support, excluding the unreleased Savage XP/AlphaChrome and early UniChrome. Later GPUs in the series offer Direct3D 10, 10.1, and 11 support, depending on the GPU.

S3's AcceleRAM technology allowed system RAM to be used to supplement the video card's RAM, and is similar to ATI's HyperMemory and NVIDIA's TurboCache.  Chrome also introduced MultiChrome technology, allowing multiple matched Chrome cards to be used simultaneously in a system to increase graphics performance, similar to ATI CrossFire and NVIDIA's SLI.

Product Families

 AlphaChrome
Unreleased - the first of the 'Chrome' product line, previously titled Savage XP and codenamed Zoetrope.

 DeltaChrome
DeltaChrome added support for Shader Model 2.0, making it S3's first released DirectX 9 product. Other features included the introduction of the Chromotion Video Engine, and dual 400 MHz DACs for multi monitor support.

 GammaChrome
GammaChrome is the first native PCI Express product line by S3 Graphics. It was originally announced on 2004-3-18 , but the product was not released until 2005-3-9. Marketed as 3rd generation DirectX 9 products competing against GeForce 6600 and Radeon X600, there is little change between it and the previous generation of product, except for the updated Chromotion 2.0 engine.

Review of the product showed it was comparable to the contemporary competitors at the market segment , but it was never able to gain a significant market share.

 GammaChrome S19
S3 originally planned GammaChrome S19 on its roadmap, but it was cancelled.

Model listing
Chronological order

 Chrome S20

This generation of S3 Chrome was announced on 2005-9-7 , and released on 2005-11-3.

 S3 Graphics 2300E
It is an embedded version of Chrome S20. It addresses 256MiB 32/64-bit GDDR2 SDRAM at maximum 500 MHz.

 Chrome 400

VIA planned the production of 2 new graphics chips, Chrome 440 and 430, by the end of 2007. The Chrome 460 will support DirectX 10 and adopts a 90 nm process, while the Chrome 430 will support DirectX 10.1 and adopts a 65nm process. Both chips will be manufactured by Fujitsu and have already entered the design verification test stage. Volume production is expected to start before the end of the year, noted the sources.

The 430 GT was released on 2008-03-20 in US market, while 440 GTX was released in 2008-05-30.

The production models are made in 65 nm process, supports DirectX 10.1, and uses PCI Express 2.0 interface. Chromotion engine now supports Variable length decoding, and dual-stream Blu-ray playback (440 GTX). Display unit includes 2 dual-link DVI transmitters with integrated HDMI (audio passthrough) and HDCP, an integrated dual channel LVDS transmitter, an integrated TV/HDTV encoder, and support for two analog CRTs. 440 GTX runs at 725 MHz core speed.

 Chrome 400 ULP
It is a mobile line for the Chrome 400. 430 ULP includes features in 430 GT, while 435 ULP and 440 ULP includes features in 440 GTX.

This product was released on 2008-09-24.

 Chrome 500

Chrome 500 series includes integrated DisplayPort support, audio controller and an AES 128 encryption engine.  The display unit loses 1 CRT and the TV encoder over Chrome 400.  The audio controller supports Dolby 7.1 digital surround sound.

The first product, Chrome 530 GT, was released on 2008-11-20.

The second product, Chrome 540 GTX was officially released on 2009-02-12 even though the product was on sale on the Gstore since 2009-02-07. It featured a displayport and a full-sized PCB; a feature uncommon amongst more modern S3 Chrome cards.

 S3 Graphics 4300E
It is the embedded version of S3 Graphics Chrome 430. It supports features found in S3 Chrome 400 and later products.  Using GDDR2 memory, it runs up to 300 MHz core speed, 500 MHz memory; in a GDDR3 setup, it runs up to 650 MHz core speed, 900 MHz memory. Display unit includes 2 dual-link DVI transmitters with integrated HDMI (with audio controller) and HDCP, an integrated LVDS transmitter, and support for 2 analog CRTs.

 OmniChrome
OmniChrome is a video card with DeltaChrome S4 Pro processor, Philips 1216/1236 TV tuner, Techwell video decoder.

 UniChrome
UniChrome is an updated S3 ProSavage used in VIA's integrated graphics chipsets.

 UniChrome Pro Series
The UniChrome Pro Series consists of the UniChrome Pro and UniChrome Pro II.  The UniChrome Pro Series is an update to UniChrome with an improved video-engine called Chromotion (MPEG2 decoder, adaptive De-Interlacing and video deblocking). It contains a 128-bit 3D graphic core providing DirectX 7 hardware support but without a Transform & Lightning (T&L) unit. UniChrome Pro is implemented in the VIA chipsets: CLE266, KM400, KN400, P4M266 and VN800;  UniChrome Pro II is implemented in the VIA chipset: VX700 
Chrome9
Chrome9 was S3 Graphics's attempt to pass Microsoft's Windows Vista Basic certification with their first integrated graphics cores supporting DirectX 9. Known variants include Chrome9 HC and Chrome9 HC3, the latter which supports HD video decode.
The most popular Chrome9 IGP (Integrated Graphics Processor) VIA chipsets are: CN896, K8M890CE/K8N890CE, P4M900 and VN896. The VX800 chipset uses the HC3, and the chipset VX900 uses the HCM with FullHD support.

 Chrome 645/640
This version is the first integrated graphics core based on the DirectX 11 cores.  Known variants include Chrome 640 and Chrome 645, These newer iGPs are a part of Via's VX11/H Media System Processor and support Blu-ray Decoding (VX11H with HDPC only).

Model listing
Chronological order

See also 
Free and open-source graphics device driver#S3 Graphics
List of VIA chipsets

References

External links
The Unichrome Project
 S3 GammaChrome S18 Pro Graphics Adapter Review at X-bit Labs.
 Beyond3D 3D Chip Tables

Graphics cards